Latia lateralis is a species of small freshwater snail or limpet, an aquatic gastropod mollusc in the family Latiidae.

Distribution
This species is endemic to the North Island of New Zealand.

Habitat
This limpet lives in clean running streams and rivers.

References

Latiidae
Gastropods described in 1852
Freshwater molluscs of Oceania